Bruce Jones may refer to:

Bruce Jones (actor) (born 1953), British actor
Bruce Jones (American football) (1904–1974), American football player
Bruce Jones (comics) (born 1944), American comic book writer
Bruce Jones (surfboards) (?–2014), pioneer in the surfboard shaping industry
Bruce D. Jones (born 1969), academic, author and political advisor
Bruce S. Jones (1883–after 1977), American politician in Wyoming